The Tambunan District is an administrative district in the Malaysian state of Sabah, part of the Interior Division which includes the districts of Beaufort, Keningau, Kuala Penyu, Nabawan, Sipitang, Tambunan and Tenom. The capital of the district is in Tambunan Town.

Etymology 
The name of this area is taken from the word "Tamadon" and "Gombunan" which combined into "Tambunan".

Demographics 

According to the last census in 2010, the population of the district is estimated to be around 35,667 inhabitants. The district of Tambunan is populated mainly by the indigenous group of Kadazan-Dusun (86%), while the rest of the population are Malay, Chinese and other indigenous groups.

Gallery

See also 
 Districts of Malaysia

References

Further reading

External links 

  Tambunan District Council
  Tambunan District Office